Pleioceras barteri grows as a shrub, liana or small tree up to  tall. Its flowers feature dark red or violet corolla lobes with yellow apex. Its habitat is forests, bush or open ground in coastal areas from sea level to  altitude. Local traditional medicinal uses include as an emmenagogue, abortifacient and also in the treatment of rheumatism and malaria. Pleioceras barteri is native to tropical West Africa and Cameroon.

References

barteri
Plants described in 1888
Plants used in traditional African medicine
Flora of West Tropical Africa
Flora of Cameroon
Taxa named by Henri Ernest Baillon